60 Second Assassin may refer to:

 60 Second Assassin (film), a 1979 Taiwanese martial arts film
 60 Second Assassin (rapper), an American rapper